Saud Hamoud 'Abid al-Qatini al-'Otaibi (1971 – April 3, 2005) was a senior member of al-Qaeda in Saudi Arabia. Al-Otaibi was responsible for bombings, including the attack on Al-Mohaya housing compound in Riyadh in 2003,  Al-Otaibi was also involved in taking booby-trapped vehicles from Qasim to Riyadh, carrying out attacks on security officers and smuggling weapons into the Kingdom.

Life
According to Asharq Al-Awsat newspaper that A-Qatini was born in the capital city in 1971,  According to Asharq Al-Awsat that he traveled to Yemen to visit sheik Muqbil bin Haadi al-Waadi'ee, and he was an extreme adherent of Islamic sharia (Islamic law). He was married and had 7 sons.

Joining Al-Qaeda
Sometimes in the late 80s’ or early 90s’ Saud Al-Otaibi traveled to Afghanistan, apparently to work with an Islamic Charity there, he had a personal relationship with Abdel Aziz al-Muqrin before September 11 attacks, Saud had been captured by the Saudi security forces more than once since 1991 to 2002.

Death
Al-Qatini was killed in a 3-day battle with Saudi security forces in Ar Rass on April 3, 2005, alongside Karim el-Mejjati. The Interior Ministry confirmed the death of Saud Al-Otaibi on April 9, 2005.

References

1971 births
2005 deaths
Deaths by firearm in Saudi Arabia
Saudi Arabian al-Qaeda members
Saudi Arabian mass murderers